Qidong is a L/LL5-an chondrite meteorite fallen in 1982 in China. After detonation a single individual specimen was found in the field. Other circumstances of fall and recovery were not reported.

Composition and classification
This meteorite is intermediate between L and LL ordinary chondrites, possibly indicating formation on a separate parent body. Its fayalite, ferrosilite place this stone at the extreme higher end of L chondrites, the metal content is typical of LL chondrites and the Co abundance in matrix kamacite (15 mg/g) is at the extreme lower end of LL chondrites.

See also 
 Glossary of meteoritics
 Meteorite

Notes

External links 
 Meteorite Studies, a photographic classification: Qidong

Meteorites found in China
History of Jiangsu
Geology of China
Geography of Jiangsu
1982 in China
1982 in science